Wojciech Giertych  (born 27 September 1951) is a Polish Roman Catholic priest in the Dominican Order. He has served in the Prefecture of the Pontifical Household as Theologian of the Pontifical Household since 2005 during the pontificates of Pope Benedict XVI and Pope Francis.

Biography
Giertych, one of nine children, was born in London, England in 1951 to writer Jędrzej Giertych and his wife Maria, six years after his family emigrated from Warsaw. His brother is Polish politician Maciej Giertych. Two of his sisters entered religious life.

Giertych began his studies at St Ignatius' College in Stamford Hill. After completing his studies at St Ignatius' in 1970, he studied history at Adam Mickiewicz University in Poznań. After graduating from the university, he joined the Dominican novitiate in 1975. He was ordained to the priesthood in 1981 in Kraków. He is an alumnus of the Pontifical University of Saint Thomas Aquinas, Angelicum in Rome, Italy, from which he obtained a licentiate in spiritual theology in 1983 and a doctorate in 1989 with a dissertation titled The new law as a rule for acts.  Giertych  has been a professor of moral theology at the Angelicum since 1994. Since 1998, he has held various roles as a member of the General Council of the Dominicans.

He was appointed theologian of the Papal Household on 1 December 2005 by Pope Benedict XVI. This post, which since the Middle Ages has most often been held by Dominicans, is tasked with providing advice to the pope on theological issues, as well as checking papal texts for theological clarity. Giertych also serves on the Pontifical Committee for International Eucharistic Congresses and as a consultant to the Congregation for the Doctrine of the Faith, the International Theological Commission, and the Congregation for the Causes of Saints.

Giertych speaks Polish, English, French, Italian, Spanish, German, Russian and Latin.

References

External links
Interview with Fr. Wojciech Giertych, OP 

1951 births
Living people
20th-century Polish Roman Catholic priests
21st-century Polish Roman Catholic priests
Polish Roman Catholic theologians
English Dominicans
Pontifical University of Saint Thomas Aquinas alumni
People from Tottenham
English people of Polish descent